Linda Gates (born 1963) is an American former professional tennis player.

Biography
A native of Burlingame, California, Gates played college tennis for Stanford University in the early 1980s. She made history at the 1985 NCAA Division I Women's Tennis Championships when she became the first woman to win consecutive doubles championships, as well as the first woman to win the singles and doubles championship in the same year. She won the Broderick Award (now the Honda Sports Award) as the nation's top collegiate tennis player in 1985.

Gates had her best performance in a grand slam tournament at the 1985 Australian Open, where she was a quarter-finalist in the women's doubles, partnering Alycia Moulton. Their run included a win over the eighth seeded Maleeva sisters (Katerina and Manuela).

Following her graduation from Stanford in 1985 she competed briefly on the professional tour. At the 1985 US Open, she won through to the third round, playing as a wildcard. She was runner-up to Gabriela Sabatini at the 1985 Japan Open, which was the Argentine's first WTA Tour title.

WTA Tour finals

Singles (0-1)

Doubles (0–1)

ITF finals

Singles: 1 (1–0)

Doubles: 8 (5–3)

References

External links
 
 

1963 births
Living people
American female tennis players
Stanford Cardinal women's tennis players
Tennis people from California
People from Burlingame, California
Pan American Games bronze medalists for the United States
Pan American Games medalists in tennis
Tennis players at the 1983 Pan American Games
Medalists at the 1983 Pan American Games